Elaphoglossum pattersoniae is a very rare species of fern that is native to Peru and Bolivia. It is very close to E. guamannianum, but is smaller in size, its blade apex is acute-obtuse, it lacks dark arachnidoid scales on its abaxial costa and has fewer blade scales. It is named after Juliet Patterson, a New York Botanical Garden collaborator.

Description
Its veins are at a 55-60° angle, and hydathodes are lacking. Its costal scales are of an orange-tan colour and it lacks intersporangial scales.

References

External links
Specimens
GBIF entry
ZipcodeZoo entry

Dryopteridaceae
Flora of Peru
Flora of Bolivia
Plants described in 1990